Events in the year 1748 in India.

Events
National income - ₹9,205 million
Madras restored to the British by the French who captured the city in 1746.

References

 
India
Years of the 18th century in India